Timema shepardi, Shepard's Timema, is a stick insect native to northern California. It was first identified in 1999. It is one of five parthenogenetic species of Timema.

References

Phasmatodea
Insects described in 1999